Georges Lacombe (19 August 1902 – 14 April 1990) was a French film director.

Filmography

1928:  La Zone (short)
1931: Boule de gomme
1932: 
1933: La Femme invisible
1933: Un jour d'été
1934: Youth 
1935: Épousez ma femme
1935: La Route heureuse
1936: Le cœur dispose
1938: Café de Paris
1939: Behind the Facade 
1939: Musicians of the Sky
1940: Paris-New York 
1940: They Were Twelve Women
1941: The Last of the Six 
1941: Montmartre-sur-Seine
1942: Le Journal tombe à cinq heures
1942: Monsieur La Souris
1943: The Stairs Without End
1944: Florence est folle
1946: Land Without Stars
1946: Martin Roumagnac
1947: Les Condamnés
1948: Prélude à la gloire
1951: The Night Is My Kingdom
1952: Les Sept Péchés capitaux, segment Le Huitième péché
1953:  The Call of Destiny 
1953: Their Last Night 
1955: La Lumière d'en face
1958: Cargaison blanche
1958: Mon coquin de père

External links
 

1902 births
1990 deaths
French film directors